Clothes Make the Man is a 1915 American film featuring Oliver Hardy.

Clothes Make the Man may also refer to:

 A line in William Shakespeare's Hamlet spoken by Polonius
 Clothes Make the Man (1921 film), an Austrian-German silent film
 Clothes Make the Man (1940 film), a 1940 German historical comedy film
 "Clothes Make the Man", a song from the 1972 animated television special The Enchanted World of Danny Kaye

See also
 Kelider machen Leute (novella), a short story on which the 1915, 1921 and 1940 films are based
 Kleider machen Leute (disambiguation)
 Clothes Make the Woman, a 1928 American silent historical romantic drama film